Mount Edgecombe or Mt Edgecombe  is a gated community in KwaZulu-Natal, South Africa, situated just north of Durban, which forms part of eThekwini, the Greater Durban Metropolitan area. It is famous for resorts and golf. It includes a retirement home. It was previously a sugar growing area. The population increased by 89% between 2001 and 2011 from 3,874 to 7,323. Its name is derived from the Earl of Mount Edgecombe in Cornwall, United Kingdom.

Commerce 
Mt Edgecombe has a sizable industrial sector with industries such as logistics (notably SPAR's distribution centre for perishables in KwaZulu-Natal) and hardware amongst others occupying Mt Edgecombe. 

The small commercial belt on the southern section of Flanders Drive (south of the M41) includes small office spaces, the Flanders Boutique Mall and a Kwikspar. On the northern section of Flanders Drive (north of the M41), lies another commercial belt comprising a string of motor delearships, automotive-related services, a few other industries and mostly notably the headquarters of the South African Sugar Research Institute and the South African Sugar Association – this makes Mt Edgecombe a pivotal hub for the South African sugar industry. 

Just north of the M41 and the CBD lies the Cornubia Mall, one of the largest shopping centres in Greater Durban which opened on 27 September 2017 and forms of Tongaat Hulett Developments' planned Cornubia mixed-use development. The development which is located on former sugarcane lands also includes a new Makro store and the controversial United Phosphorus Limited plant.

Geography 
Mt Edgecombe is situated on a gentle rolling terrain about 4 km inland from the Indian Ocean on the uMhlanga Coast/North Region of eThekwini. 

Mt Edgecombe is situated approximately 14 km north-east of Durban and is bordered by uMhlanga to the east, Durban to the south-east, Phoenix to the east and sugarcane plantations to the north and south.

Mt Edgecombe is broken up into the following areas:

 The Central Business District (CBD) which lies on the western boundary of Mt Edgecombe and east of the R102. Its main street is Siphosethu Drive and includes offices spaces, schools and warehouses.
 The industrial area which lies in west of the north-western part of Mt Edgecombe and is situated between the R102 to the west and the railway to the east, however a small portion does lie east of the R102 and to the west of the M41. 
 The largest area of space which accounts for 59% of Mt Edgecombe's total land area is the Mt Edgecombe Country Club Estate which is a residential golf estate centered around two championship golf courses of the Mt Edgecombe Country Club. The estate comprises Mt Edgecombe Country Club Estate 1 and Mt Edgecombe Country Club Estate 2 which is the largest component of the estate.
 Although administratively part of Blackburn, the commercial belt north of the M41 is regarded as part of Mt Edgecombe.

Infrastructure

Healthcare 
The only hospital in the Mt Edgecombe area is the Life Mount Edgecombe Hospital which is a private hospital owned by Life Healthcare Group. The hospital is located on the border between Phoenix and Mt Edgecombe in the Rockford suburb of Phoenix to the west of the R102.

Rail 
Mt Edgecombe's railway station located on the eastern boundary of Mt Edgecombe's industrial area is served by the commuter railway service of Metrorail and lies on its North Coast Line connecting Mt Edgecombe to Verulam, oThongathi and  KwaDukuza in the north-east, Phoenix (railway station) in the south-west and Durban, Amanzimtoti, Kingsburgh, Umkomaas and Scottburgh in the south-east.

Road 
Mt Edgecombe has access to two major highways in the eThekwini Metro, the N2 and the M41. 

The N2 Outer Ring Road runs past Mount Edgecombe bordering the town to the east and separating it from the bordering town of uMhlanga. The N2 highway links Mount Edgecombe to the King Shaka International Airport and KwaDukuza in the north-east and Durban and Port Shepstone in the south-west. Access from the N2 to Mt Edgecombe can be obtained through the M41 Mt Edgecombe Interchange (Exit 182). 

The M41 highway is a metropolitan freeway linking Mt Edgecombe to uMhlanga in the east and Durban in the south-east (via the M4). The M41 intersects the N2 at the Mount Edgecombe Interchange and borders Mt Edgecombe Country Club Estate to the north and the mixed-use development of Cornubia and the commercial belt to the south. Access to Mt Edgecombe from the M41 can be obtained through the Flanders Drive interchange. 

Other arterial routes in Mt Edgecombe include the R102 and M26. 

The R102 North Coast Road is a regional route bordering Mt Edgecombe to the west and links the town to Durban in the south-east, Newlands and New Germany in the south-west (via M5), Verulam in the north and King Shaka International Airport and oThongathi in the north-east. The R102 can be used an alternative route to the North Coast for motorists and commuters avoiding the oThongathi Toll Plaza on the N2 near oThongathi. 

The M26 Phoenix Highway links Mt Edgecombe to the neighbouring township of Phoenix to the west.

See also
Illovo Sugar

References

Populated places in eThekwini Metropolitan Municipality